Alexander of Canterbury (fl. 1120) was an English monk of Christ Church, Canterbury. He  is known as the author of a work, Dicta Anselmi archiepiscopi, which has been also ascribed to Eadmer. He was employed as a messenger from the Countess Matilda to St. Anselm, and was sent by St. Anselm to Pope Paschal II for his instruction on various points.

References

12th-century English people
English Christian monks